Black Pearl or Black Pearls may refer to:

Biology 
 Tahitian Pearls, "Black Pearls" an organic gem formed from the black lip oyster

Films 
 Black Pearls (film), a 1919 German silent film
 The Black Pearl, a 1928 American silent film starring Thomas A. Curran
 Black Pearl (1934 film), a Polish romantic crime drama
 The Black Pearl, a 1977 American film based on the 1967 Scott O'Dell novel
 Black Pearls, a 1991 martial arts movie also known as Fearless Tiger
 Black Pearl, a fictional ship in the Pirates of the Caribbean film series

Literature 
 The Black Pearl (comics), a 1996 series published by Dark Horse Comics
 The Black Pearl (Scott O'Dell), a 1967 young adult novel
 The Black Pearl (play), an 1862 comedy in three acts
 The Black Pearl of the Borgias, a gem in the 1904 Sherlock Holmes story "The Adventure of the Six Napoleons"
 The Black Pearl (Madlen Namro), a 2012 Polish book

Music 
 Black Pearl (American band), a San-Francisco-based band
 Black Pearl (South Korean group), a South Korean girl group
 "Black Pearl" (Checkmates, Ltd. song), 1969
 "Black Pearl", a song on the 2013 Exo album XOXO
 Variatio 25. a 2 Clav. adagio, known as "the black pearl" of Bach's Goldberg Variations

Albums 
 Black Pearl (Yo-Yo album), 1992
 Black Pearl (Jimmy McGriff album), 1971
 Black Pearl, a 1982 album by Pat Travers
 Black Pearls, a 1964 album by John Coltrane
 Black Pearl, a 2022 album by 50 Foot Wave

People 
 José Leandro Andrade (1901–1957), Uruguayan footballer
 Reno Anoaʻi (active from 2002), member of the American wrestling Anoa'i family
 Josephine Baker (1906–1975), American dancer, singer, and actress
 Larbi Benbarek (1914–1992), Moroccan-French footballer
 Eusébio (1942–2014), Mozambican-born Portuguese footballer
 Harris Martin (1865–1903), African American boxer
 Paul McGrath (footballer) (born 1959), Irish footballer
 Pelé (born 1940), Brazilian footballer
 Everage Richardson (born 1985), American basketball player
 Wilma Rudolph (1940–1994), American sprinter
 Roger Shah (born 1972), German electronic music composer and producer

Other uses 
 Black Pearl (yacht), a sailing yacht launched in 2016
 Black Pearl, New Orleans, a neighborhood in Louisiana, US
 Black Pearl, a community art installation at New Brighton, Merseyside, England
 Black Pearl, subname of Louis XIII (cognac)
 Black Pearl, a brigantine once owned by Barclay H. Warburton III, and the restaurant named after it

See also
 "Black Perl", a code poem